Standings and results for Group 4 of the UEFA Euro 1996 qualifying tournament.

Standings

Results

Goalscorers

References

A. Yelagin - History of European Championships 1960-2000 (Terra-Sport, Moscow, 2002) - attendance information

Group 4
1994–95 in Italian football
qual
1994–95 in Ukrainian football
1995–96 in Ukrainian football
1994–95 in Croatian football
1995–96 in Croatian football
Croatia at UEFA Euro 1996
1994–95 in Slovenian football
1995–96 in Slovenian football
1994 in Lithuanian football
1995 in Lithuanian football
1994 in Estonian football
1995 in Estonian football